Conceição da Barra is the northernmost municipality in the Brazilian state of Espírito Santo. The city is also the northernmost coastal city of the state. Its population was 31,273 (2020) and its area is 1,188.044 km².

The municipality contains the  Itaúnas State Park, created in 1991, which protects the coast up to the border with Bahia.
It contains the  Rio Preto National Forest.
It contains part of the  Córrego Grande Biological Reserve.

The climate is tropical, warm and mostly humid, with one or two dry months.

References

Populated places established in 1891
Populated coastal places in Espírito Santo
1891 establishments in Brazil
Municipalities in Espírito Santo